Charlotte Ives Boissevain (November 27, 1886 – September 1976), born Charlotte Danziger, was an American actress who appeared on Broadway and in silent films.

Early life 
Charlotte "Lottie" Danziger was born in Boston, Massachusetts, the daughter of Charles Danziger and Leah Cohen Danziger. Her mother was born in Hungary; she died in 1904.

Career 
Danziger acted using her original name in 1909, as the protegee of Eleanor Robson; but she soon began to use the name "Charlotte Ives", and this was the name she used personally and professionally thereafter. Film credits for Ives included roles in several silent pictures: Clothes (1914), The Dictator (1915), A Prince in a Pawnshop (1916), The Man of Mystery (1917), The Warfare of the Flesh (1917), Prince Cosimo (1919), and The Splendid Romance (1919). On stage, she appeared in Broadway and touring productions including The Upstart (1910), The Turning Point (1910), As a Man Thinks (1911), Passers-by (1912), Liberty Hall (1913), A Woman Killed with Kindness (1914), A Scrap of Paper (1914), The High Cost of Loving (1914), The Brat (1917), What's Your Husband Doing? (1917), The Man Who Stayed Home (1918), and She Had to Know (1925).

Personal life 
Ives was engaged to marry opera singer Antonio Scotti in 1912, and married Dutch-born importer Jan M. Boissevain in 1921. Her brother-in-law, Eugen Boissevain, was married first to suffragist Inez Milholland, and later to poet Edna St. Vincent Millay. She became a Dutch citizen upon marriage, but petitioned for the restoration of her US citizenship in 1940, under the provisions of the Cable Act of 1922. Charlotte Ives Boissevain lived in Cap d'Antibes in her later years, and was close to fellow American actress Maxine Elliott there. She had two sisters, Helen I. Maltby and Augusta Hartley. Her husband died in 1964, and she died in 1976, aged 90 years, in France.

References

External links 

 A photograph of Charlotte Ives, made by Carl Van Vechten in 1943, in the New York Public Library Digital Collections
 

1886 births
1976 deaths
20th-century American actresses
American stage actresses
American silent film actresses
American expatriate actors in France
Actresses from Boston